Betroka is a genus of insects in the family Depressariidae from Madagascar. 
There is only one species in this genus: Betroka jacobsella Viette, 1955.

Publication
Viette, P. 1955a. Nouveaux Tineoidea (s.l.) de Madagascar (Lep.). - Annales de la Société Entomologique de France 123(1954):75–114.

References

Ethmiinae
Taxa named by Pierre Viette
Moth genera